During the Dirty War in Argentina from 1976–1983, detention centers caused an immense amount of fear for victims all throughout the country. The prisoners, after being kidnapped and interrogated, would be forced to survive while living amongst the worst of conditions in a variety of different centers. Once the kidnapped were forced into detention centers, they immediately became the disappeared (Spanish: los desaparecidos). Although all camps had their "unique" ways of torturing, every detention center incorporated a torture room that each victim had to encounter. However, the torture did not end here. They were humiliated and dehumanized by the hands of the leaders, losing their ability to talk, shower, eat, and sleep. The Dirty War and select detention centers were notorious for mass murders to remove all evidence of the torture that had transpired. At the end of the Dirty War and a change in government, prisoners were released on the street blindfolded. The identity of the torturers in all of the detention centers was kept clandestinely at all times.

Detention Centers in Argentina 
Argentina was said to have hosted over 520 clandestine detention centers during the Dirty War. No two detention centers were the same in torture methods, leadership, or location. However, they did represent a similar theme of the fear of political opposition, punishing the prisoners that were suspected to be involved in socialism or other forms of political dissent. Much of this information comes from primary sources that have since been transferred into writings of secondary source authors. Included below are detention centers that were located solely in Buenos Aires, Argentina. Because of the clandestine attitude surrounding the camps while running, little information is known about the true nature of these prisons.

1. Escuela Superior de Mecánica de la Armada/Navy Petty-Officers School of Mechanics 

La Escuela Superior de Mecánica de la Armada (ESMA) is, arguably, the most known detention center during the Dirty War. This detention center, located in the heart of Buenos Aires—approximately two blocks from the 1978 World Cup Stadium—tortured around 5,000 people by the time it was shut down. By the time the Dirty War ended in 1983, only 150 of the victims survived. This particular torture center immediately split families upon their arrival, murdering the mothers as quickly as possible. From there, victims would travel to the basement that housed the majority of the torture to have their picture taken. Intense interrogations and torture plans made on an individual basis would ensue. Present day ESMA stands as a memorial for the human rights violations during this time.

2. Club Atlético 

Acting as a location that promoted the torture of socialists against the Argentinian regime, Club Atlético held as many as 1,500 "political dissenters" at one point, even though its maximum capacity hovered around 200 people. This center shared commonalities of ESMA, as it also promoted the use of its basement as a torture chamber. This is not surprising, as Club Atlético was part of a largely connected link of clandestine operations that contributed to the detention, torture, and extermination of hundreds of people in this location alone.

3. Olimpo 

Similar to Club Atlético, Olimpo was torturing more people than their facilities allowed. Located in Floresta, this place tortured around 500 people at its peak, ignoring the allowance of only 150 people in the building and utilizing the operation room as the torture site to mock the victims. This inhumane treatment that took place in the operation room highlighted the torturer's ruthlessness. Olimpo, specifically, has been known for its horrific interrogation methods of those accused of being associated with a rival political position.

4. Virrey Ceballos 

The theme for all of these detention centers are very similar in execution. However, the Virrey Cerallos, in the neighborhood of Monserrat, claimed its "fame" through its "efficient" torture methods in a garage of sorts. This more public showing of the clandestine actions occurring in Argentina during this time demonstrates how easy it was for Argentinian officials to violate human rights.

5. Automotores Orletti 

Orletti was also placed in the garage of a building. This torturing featured members of the military of both Argentina and Uruguay as a way to instill fear in the victims. This center, in particular, involved many nations that were also involved in Operation Condor as a whole. This implementation of fear, in principle, was to create an environment where the prisoner would have to admit to all political dissent he/she had committed. Because most of the victims were not actually members of the socialist party, they were either forced to falsely confess to their involvement in political opposition or take a chance with murder from the hands of the Argentinian government.

6. Garaje Azopardo 

Detention centers during the Dirty War have the reputation of torturing its victims. However, this garage of a torture center made its victims work and transmit passports illegally to friends of the Argentinian government. This addition of manual labor added a whole new layer to the dignity that these prisoners lost while trapped in this prison. The Garaje has been accused of only giving victims one meal a day. With these conditions, it shows that each individual center had its "own unique trademark" that created new ways of violating human rights.

Torture 
Beginning as early as 1976, victims of the Dirty War were kidnapped from homes and public places and brought to detention centers like the ones discussed above, pending any suspicion of them being involved in political opposition to the Argentinian regime. Once these prisoners were brought to the respective camp, methods varied towards the type and severity of the torture. A New York Times article written on October 4, 1976 shares the experience of a victim who was blindfolded, hit, and forced to be nude. These conditions were only meant to scare the victims, in the hopes that they would share their secrets of socialism. A process of interrogation followed the "minor" torture methods in order to convince the prisoners to confess to the political dissent that they had committed. When these methods seemed insufficient to reveal the "hidden truths" of the prisoners, the leaders of the clandestine detention centers went one step further to offer more torture methods. Accounts of sexual abuse, cigarette burns, and electric shocks were common during this eight-year period of victimization. Methods, such as pushing prisoners off of planes into oceans, were also used to kill the victims.

As more political opponents were captured and tortured, the idea of missing a loved one became more common. The Argentinian government contributed to the tortures themselves, so there were no governmental officials to oppose the human rights violations that were transpiring. Instead, most victims and their families were forced to remain quiet to stay alive. However, there was a movement of women called Las madres de la Plaza de Mayo that began in 1977, a year after the beginning of the Dirty War. These mothers marched along the Argentinian government, participating in non-violent protests to fight for the return of their children. Unlike the tangible torture that the kidnapped felt, the pain of the mothers in this movement was expressed through their actions. In many ways, this can be seen as a form of torture, the torture that las madres could not have their beloved children back in their lives. Some of the mothers would end up protesting for the rest of their lives, refusing to give up on the memory of the child.

United States involvement in Argentina 
The United States, through its covert CIA and other intelligence agencies, has declassified certain documents that proves their knowledge of Operation Condor during the 1970s. Operation Condor is an umbrella operation of the CIA, in which six Latin American countries banded together to remove all potential political opponents in the Southern Cone. The Dirty War connects as a specific event to the larger Operation Condor. 

In a conversation between Secretary of State Henry Kissinger and many of his colleagues, one of them argues that the Argentinian junta was overdoing the control it had over its citizens. Kissinger simply remarks that the treatment and policy of detention centers is, in fact, good for United States interests while also stating that this junta will need "a little encouragement from [the United States]" to pursue its efforts. 

Most famously, Henry Kissinger is associated with a big personality and his commentary encouraging the Dirty War to advance in Argentina. Among many other quotes, this former Secretary of State spoke openly to the leaders of Operation Condor by supporting their efforts; he believed that "the quicker you succeed the better."  Kissinger shows the tolerance of the United States when it comes to the pain and torture of other people in other nations held both inside and outside of the detention centers. He also has been described as giving the "green light" to the nations that were causing pain for so many prisoners. This idea highlights his outspoken support of this event. Kissinger was the leader who spoke, but many of the leaders of America during this time had a similar train of thought.

A majority of the American effort in Argentina dealt with the economy, largely ignoring the issues that were happening on ground level. Between the lack of jobs and abundant refugees flooding into Argentina, America believed its duty was to control and maintain the balance of the economy. There was little recognition of the treatment of Dirty War victims, as it was left to the side in order to deal with the "real, pressing issues" of the time in the opinion of the United States government.

United States inaction in Argentina 
The opinions of Kissinger, supporting the continuation of Operation Condor policy and the restriction of human rights, were shared by other figures of power during this time as well. This contributes to why the United States remained silent when victims were being tortured by the thousands. Primary sources tell a story that proves America's knowledge and recognition of the severity of the events in Argentina during the Dirty War. The United States government published a list of American people who were either dead or disappeared in 1978 at the hands of the Dirty War in order to prove that the desaparecidos were being tortured both by domestic and abroad in detention centers. Following this release of information, no major American opposition movements followed this direct proof of people who had vanished from the world. A year later, the United States sent the Inter-American Commission on Human Rights to travel to Argentina to see the impact of the abuses of human rights on the nation as a whole. By the time the Commission came by in 1979, the United States had decreed that terrorism was not an issue in this area of the world.

The exchange of words did not help to create change in Argentina. Henry Kissinger consistently commented on the Dirty War without proactively fixing the situation. He was not the only one to disregard what was transpiring during Operation Condor. In a conversation between men who wrote for the United States Embassy in Argentina, they confirmed that 80-90% of the clandestine detention centers were destroyed by 1979, the year that the Inter-American Commission on Human Rights traveled to Argentina. Two of the men remark that this progress was satisfactory due to the fact that the majority of the camps had been removed.  Yet, the knowledge that most of the camps were no longer functioning raises the question of where the victims of these centers went. A large percentage of the victims that were once "housed" in the detention centers that were destroyed were confirmed to be disappeared, dead, or transferred to the small percentage of camps that were still running at the time.

References

Dirty War
Detention centers